Tesla products include a significant number of software and hardware Easter eggs among other notable and unique software features, such as a suite of video games, doggy mode, emissions testing mode, "caraoke", and romance mode.

Back to the Future phone app

Touching the battery icon inside the Tesla mobile app with the vehicle at exactly 121 miles (or 121 km) of range was discovered to launch a Back to the Future Easter egg.  All aspects of this Easter egg were observed to occur within the mobile app.  A pop-up message displays "Time Circuits Off" and "Be sure to reset your clock to account for temporal displacement". The name of the vehicle changes to "OUTATIME" within the app.  "Charging scheduled" changes to "Time Circuits On".  "121 miles" changes to "1.21 GW".  The "Charging" tab changes to "Fuel Chamber".  Below the now "Fuel Chamber" tab reads as "Current Output: 300R" which may refer to the number of Back to the Future replica cars being made per year by DeLorean Motor Company.  The vehicle location display changes to "1600 S Azusa Ave Rowland Heights", one of the movie filming locations, and a service appointment appears to be scheduled for November 5, 1955, which is an important day within the film.

Voice commands

Rick and Morty – sentry mode voice activation

Voice command "Keep Tesla Safe" or "Keep Summer Safe" were discovered to activate sentry mode.  Sentry mode, which was originally depicted on the in vehicle display as HAL 9000 from 2001: A Space Odyssey, but replaced by what appears to be the eye of a sentient sentry turret from the Valve video game Portal, is a Tesla security feature that can be toggled on or off using voice commands, "Enable/Disable Sentry Mode" or "Turn Sentry Mode On/Off".  Voice commands "Keep Tesla Safe" or "Keep Summer Safe" can also enable sentry mode.  The extra commands are a reference to a scene from season 2, episode 6 of Rick and Morty, entitled "The Ricks Must Be Crazy", where Rick instructs his vehicle to keep Morty's sister, Summer, safe while Rick and Morty venture into Rick's microverse car battery. Elon Musk notably wore a Butterbot T-shirt to the 2018 Tesla Annual Shareholder's Meeting indicating his interest in the show.

Charge-port alternative voice commands

Voice commands "open butthole" and "close butthole" open and close the charge port, but may open the trunk instead in some cases.  "Open bunghole" and "close bunghole" also work and may be a reference to Beavis and Butthead.

Seat heater alternative voice command

Voice command "my balls are cold" turns on the seat heaters.

Voice command "eject X seat" where X = Driver or Passenger, will turn on that seat's heater to max.

Climate control alternative voice command

Voice command "enable/disable life support" turns the climate control on or off.

Santa mode

Voice commands "Ho Ho Ho" or "Ho Ho Ho Not Funny" will activate the Santa Mode Easter egg.  If voice command "Ho Ho Ho" is used, Run Rudolph Run by Chuck Berry will play inside of the vehicle.  If voice command "Ho Ho Ho Not Funny" is used, Grandma Got Run Over by a Reindeer will play inside of the vehicle instead.  Otherwise, the two commands activate the same Santa Mode Easter egg.  While driving or in park, a snow effect appears above the depiction of the vehicle. When parked, the image of the car is replaced by Santa Claus on his sleigh.  Using the turn signal will result in the sound of sleigh bells in addition to the normal turn signal sound.  In previous versions, the vehicle was depicted as Santa Claus on his sleigh while driving as well as in park, Computer vision showed the road as ice, and other cars were depicted as reindeer while driving.

Mars, Mars Rover and Starship

Tesla vehicles incorporate a Mars, Mars Rover and Starship themed Easter egg.  Upon activation, the GPS map on the touchscreen display shows the surface of Mars instead of the surface of the Earth.  The surface moves and turns as the car travels just as the normal GPS would.  The arrow representing the vehicle on the GPS map is replaced by a depiction of a Mars rover.  Finally, the "About Your Tesla" menu, previously available by pressing the Tesla "T" icon at the top left of the touchscreen display, shows the SpaceX Interplanetary Spaceship design, which was presented in 2016 as part of the Interplanetary Transport System.  The vehicle has since been redesigned and renamed as Big Falcon Rocket and then Starship.

SpaceX and Tesla, Inc. are linked in a number of ways other than the depiction of the Starship. Elon Musk is CEO of both companies and the two companies collaborate often.  In early 2018, Elon Musk's Tesla Roadster was used as a payload for the Falcon Heavy test flight.  It was originally planned that Elon's roadster, which carries Starman and a number of its own Easter eggs (to confuse the aliens), would end up in orbit around Mars.  Instead, the roadster ended up in an orbit around the sun, as it was more important to demonstrate the full capacity of Falcon Heavy.

Mario Kart: Rainbow Road and Don't Fear the Reaper/SNL: More Cowbell

Autosteer capable vehicles with autosteer engaged can activate an Easter egg involving the in car audio and a change in the on screen animation.  The computer vision generated road that the car is driving on, denoted by two lines, will change into a rainbow which is similar to that of Rainbow Road, the final level in each version of the video game Mario Kart.  At the same time, the song (Don't Fear) The Reaper by Blue Öyster Cult plays in the cabin of the vehicle.  Notably, the version of the song that plays is taken from the Saturday Night Live skit, More Cowbell, in which music producer "The Bruce Dickinson", played by host Christopher Walken, encourages Gene Frenkle, played by then cast member Will Ferrell, to play his instrument, the cowbell, with zeal.  As part of the Easter egg, Christopher Walken can be heard stating his lines from the skit, that he "has a fever" and that the "only prescription, is more cowbell".

Rainbow chargeport light

While the Tesla vehicle is plugged in, pushing the charge port control button on the charger handle 10 times quickly will activate the Easter egg.  The charge port light will cycle through all of the colors of the rainbow.

Monty Python

Tesla vehicles may be assigned a name within the settings available on the touchscreen.  Naming the car either "Patsy", "Rabbit of Caerbannog", "Mr. Creosote" (with or without the period), "Flying Circus", "Biggus Dickus" or "Unladen Swallow" will activate the Monty Python easter egg. Once this is done, The Foot of Cupid will immediately drop down the length of the screen.  The Foot of Cupid is a trademarked recurring gag in the Monty Python series, Monty Python's Flying Circus.  The foot is accompanied by the sound of flatulence.  The foot will disappear and upon opening Theater Mode, a new Monty Python option will appear.  This option is essentially the same as YouTube except that it opens directly to the Monty Python channel.  The first to discover the Easter egg was Iwan Eberhart, a Model 3 owner in Switzerland who named his Model 3, "The Rabbit of Caerbannog" with no foreknowledge of the Easter egg.  This is not the first time that Monty Python has been purposefully added to Tesla vehicles.

Model X Light Show and Trans-Siberian Orchestra

A Model X exclusive holiday light show is initiated by activating this Easter egg.  The light show utilizes the headlights, fog lights and turn signals. Wizards in Winter by the Trans-Siberian Orchestra plays and portions of the vehicle, including the front doors and the falcon wing back doors will open and close autonomously in time with the music. The rear view mirrors will also retract in time with the music.

James Bond – Lotus Esprit submarine

This Easter egg applies only to vehicles with the air suspension package.  In the controls menu, under the suspension tab, the usual image of the Tesla is replaced by the submarine version of the Lotus Esprit that James Bond drove off a pier into the ocean in the movie The Spy Who Loved Me.  A new "Depth (Leagues)" drop down menu appears next to the Esprit.  The air suspension will raise and lower depending on the selected depth.  Activating the Easter egg a second time will result in the submarine fins being replaced by wheels.  Once again, adjusting the "Depth" will adjust the air suspension, changing the position of the esprit with respect to the wheels.

Tesla, Inc., Elon, and 007 have other notable connections besides the easter egg.  In 2013, Musk won an auction and took possession of the original Bond submersible used in the film.  In 2019, Elon Musk announced at a shareholder meeting that Tesla had a design for a real, electric submarine car.

Backgammon Lost Reference

In the entertainment menu, above the "play game" button for backgammon, there is text that reads "Two players, two sides. One is light, one is dark."  This is a quote from one of the early episodes of Lost in which John Locke teaches Walt how to play backgammon.  The quote is believed by some to have significant meaning in the series.  Once a game of Backgammon is started on the Tesla in-vehicle display, the lower right corner of the backgammon board can be observed to display the numbers "4 8 15 16 23 42".  These numbers are part of the Mythology of Lost and recur throughout the series.  Whenever a game score matches one of the numbers, the game score turns green rather than the usual grey.

Sketchpad

In previous software versions, a sketchpad could be accessed by quickly tapping the Tesla "T" at the top of the touchscreen display three times.  Activating the sketchpad turns the in vehicle display into a sandbox where one can draw a picture and submit the result to Tesla.  Drawing options include a marker and eraser, control of color, control of marker width, the ability to undo errors, and a "fill" option.  When the "submit" button is used, a text box pops up and asks "Are you sure you want Tesla to critique your artistic masterpiece?"  As a nod to The Matrix, a metaphorical Red pill and blue pill option is given in the form of two buttons at the bottom of the same text box.  A blue button reads "No, the world isn't ready for my art" while a red button exclaims "Yes, I am an artist!"

Elon Musk has featured sketchpad submissions on his Twitter feed in the past. The sketchpad may be upgraded to include animation support.

Performance mode

In previous software versions, the performance mode Easter egg added a drop-down menu to the "About Your Tesla" menu.  The performance mode Easter egg allowed the driver to choose any version of the car.  Performance mode did not appear to modify any features of the car.  This Easter egg was accessed by holding the Tesla "T" icon at the top of the touchscreen display for five seconds.  Once the "T" was released, a text box was revealed along with a keyboard for entering text.  The text box read "please enter access code" with a text entry field below and button options "OK" and "Cancel" below that.  This text box was mainly used by service centers and showrooms for purposes such as service mode and showroom mode, but also allowed access to certain Easter eggs.  Entering the word "Performance" and pressing "OK" activated the Performance Mode Easter egg.

Spaceballs and Ludicrous+

This Easter egg is included only in vehicles that feature the ludicrous mode option.  The Easter egg is activated from the controls menu, by switch the software-controlled acceleration from "sport" to "ludicrous" and then tapping and holding the "ludicrous" text for 5 seconds.  The screen will go black for a short time.  A star field will swiftly appear and zoom forward, closely resembling a jump to ludicrous speed from the movie Spaceballs.  

In subsequent updates, this Easter egg was co-opted to activate a genuine "ludicrous+" performance enhancement beyond the normal ludicrous mode.  When the Easter egg is activated, the star field zooms forward until the entire screen is momentarily white.  When the flash fades, a text box is revealed which asks "Are you sure you want to push the limits? This will cause accelerated wear of the motor, gearbox and battery".  As a nod to The Matrix, a metaphorical red pill and blue pill option is given in the form of two buttons at the bottom of the text box.  A blue button reads "No, I want my Mommy" while a red button exclaims "Yes, bring it on!".  If "Yes, bring it on!" is chosen, the car may prepare itself by heating the battery.  The smaller display in front of the driver changes to give a purple indicator for battery temperature, to show the front and rear motors on the car graphic, and to give a table with values including peak longitudinal acceleration.

In the movie Spaceballs, there is only one speed which exceeds ludicrous.  As a continuation of Tesla's use of Spaceballs terminology, future versions of the Model S and Model X, as well as the Tesla Roadster (2020), will include a new mode of acceleration which is even faster than Ludicrous+.  This new mode is called "Plaid".

The Hitchhiker's Guide to the Galaxy

Entering the number "42" as the name of the Tesla vehicle activates The Hitchhiker's Guide to the Galaxy Easter egg.  The name of the car is changed to "Life, the Universe, and Everything".  In Douglas Adams' science fiction comedy The Hitchhiker's Guide to the Galaxy, "42" is determined to be the "Ultimate Answer to Life, the Universe, and Everything".  There is some difficulty, however, in determining the corresponding Ultimate Question.

Spinal Tap

As a nod to the movie This is Spinal Tap, volume and climate control fan settings go up to 11.

Cybertruck in Camp Mode screensaver

After the official Cybertruck reveal occurred on November 22, 2019, Tesla vehicles including the S, X and 3 received an update which included camp mode.  When in camp mode, Tesla vehicles are able to maintain airflow, temperature, interior lighting, play music, and power devices for an extended period of time while the car is in park.  When camp mode is enabled for more than 10 minutes an animated screensaver of a campground appears on the screen.  Several months after the release of camp mode, a partly obscured Cybertruck was noticed in the background.

Easter eggs in products that are not for sale

Website – Starman

The background for the login page of the Tesla Inc. website, is a picture of the inside of the Tesla Semi cabin.  Clicking on the background toggles it to an image of Elon Musk's Tesla Roadster which was transported to space by SpaceX. Elon Musk is CEO of both companies and the two companies collaborate often.  In early 2018, Elon Musk's Tesla Roadster was used as a payload for the Falcon Heavy test flight.  It was originally planned that Elon's roadster, which carries Starman and a number of its own easter eggs (to confuse the aliens), would end up in orbit around Mars.  Instead, the roadster ended up in an orbit around the sun, as it was more important to demonstrate the full capacity of Falcon Heavy.

S3XY

At the top of the Tesla website are links to available Tesla models, the Model S, the Model 3,  Model X, and the Model Y.  Since the number 3 is similar to the letter E, this menu of links appears to spell out "SEX" ("S3X"), and with the Y included, "SEXY" ("S3XY").  The chronology of the cars is out of order, since the Model X began sales well before the Model 3.  Based on the comments of Elon Musk it is well documented that the hidden message was purposeful.  At the reveal event for the Model Y, Musk discussed the naming of the Tesla vehicles including the joke.  On multiple occasions, Musk has discussed that the intended name for the "Model 3" would have been the "Model E", however Ford, having the rights to the name "Model E", would not allow Tesla use it.  According to Musk, "Ford killed SEX".

Nice Try – Model Y teaser image

Before the reveal of the Tesla Model Y, a teaser image was released.  YouTuber Marques Brownlee (MKBHD) put the image into an image editor to see if increasing the brightness would reveal more of the highly anticipated vehicle's exterior.  No other exterior hints were forthcoming.  Instead, the result was an Easter egg showing that Tesla had anticipated this approach by fans.  Where the licence plate would be on the Model Y, a message read "NICE TRY."

Hidden Tesla Tequila Bottle

After Tesla Tequila was made available for sale, the product image was noticed hidden in a "Power Everything" poster that had been used in Tesla sales and service centers and online for some time.  Some believed that the hidden image of the Tesla Tequila bottle had been there, unnoticed, for several years.  It has since been revealed that the poster may have been altered after the Tesla Tequila product launch.

Removed and unreleased Easter eggs

Model S team photo

This is the first Tesla Easter egg discovered. In previous software versions an "About your Tesla" menu could be accessed by tapping the Tesla "T" at the top of the touchscreen display.  By tapping and holding the bottom right corner of the "About your Tesla" menu (the model designation number), the depicted Model S would zoom away and be replaced with a picture of the vehicle development team.  After a 2020 update the photo is no longer accessible.

Model 3 team photo and silhouette

In previous software versions, an "About Your Tesla" menu could be accessed by tapping on the Tesla "T" icon at the top left of the touchscreen display.  On the "About Your Tesla" menu, pressing and holding the "3" of "Model 3" for about 10 seconds would bring up a picture of the Model 3 development team.  After some time, the Tesla team picture was removed by over the air software update.  Instead, pressing the "3" for 10 seconds would cause the Model 3 depiction in the "About Your Tesla" menu to zoom away and be replaced by a black line silhouette of the Model 3.  Neither the team photo nor the silhouette can be accessed currently.

Marilyn Monroe

On March 7, 2018, CEO of Tesla Inc., Elon Musk stated on Twitter that the Model X would "do a cover of Happy Birthday by Marilyn Monroe".  The Easter egg was not released.

Notable omissions

Tesla easter eggs often involve popular media for which Tesla CEO and Product Architect, Elon Musk, is known to be a fan.  An example would be the Rick and Morty easter egg where voice commands, "Keep Tesla Safe" and "Keep Summer Safe" both activate Sentry Mode.  Elon notably wore a Butterbot T-shirt to the 2018 Tesla Annual Shareholder's Meeting indicating his interest in the show before the easter egg was found.  Elon has also shown that he is a fan of Monty Python, James Bond, Spaceballs, and The Hitchhiker's Guide to the Galaxy.  Each are represented as easter eggs in Tesla products.

Elon Musk has expressed interest in a wide variety of other media for which no easter eggs have been found in Tesla products.  Some examples include the Foundation series by Isaac Asimov, Star Wars, and The Lord of the Rings.  Elon has been known to hold Star Trek in high regard, referring to it as a rare example of a depiction of a positive future for humanity,  Notably, the Star Trek franchise also complimented Musk in the fourth episode of Star Trek: Discovery, comparing him to the Wright Brothers, and the fictional inventor of the warp drive, Zefram Cochrane.

Hoax Easter eggs

The Tesla beating heart

This Easter egg was a hoax and cannot be activated.  On November 17, 2018, Joel Paglione made a post to Imgur claiming that if both charge port-like panels are pushed at the same time, which looks like one is awkwardly hugging the back of the car, a second charge port opens up on the right side of the car and a pulsing/beating red heart light is displayed.  This Easter egg was determined to be a complete fabrication.

See also
 List of Easter eggs in Microsoft products
 List of Google Easter eggs
 Tesla, Inc.
 Easter egg (media)
 Elon Musk
 Tesla Model S
 Tesla Model 3
 Tesla Model X
 Tesla Model Y
 Tesla Cybertruck
 Tesla Semi
 Tesla Roadster (2008)
 Tesla Roadster (2020)

References

Easter eggs
Elon Musk
In-jokes
Easter egg (media)